Log reduction is a measure of how thoroughly a decontamination process reduces the concentration of a contaminant. 
It is defined as the common logarithm of the ratio of the levels of contamination before and after the process, so an increment of 1 corresponds to a reduction in concentration by a factor of 10.
In general, an -log reduction means that the concentration of remaining contaminants is only  times that of the original. So for example, a 0-log reduction is no reduction at all, while a 1-log reduction corresponds to a reduction of 90 percent from the original concentration, and a 2-log reduction corresponds to a reduction of 99 percent from the original concentration.

Mathematical definition
Let  and  be the numerical values of the concentrations of a given contaminant, respectively before and after treatment, following a defined process.
It is irrelevant in what units these concentrations are given, provided that both use the same units.

Then an and -log reduction is achieved, where

.

Example
Let the concentration of some contaminant be 580 ppm before and 0.725 ppm after treatment. Then

Rounded down,  is 2, so a 2-log reduction is achieved.

Conversely, an -log reduction means that a reduction by a factor of  has been achieved.

Log reduction and percentage reduction
Reduction is often expressed as a percentage. The closer it is to 100%, the better.
Letting  and  be as before, a reduction by  % is achieved, where

Example
Let, as in the earlier example, the concentration of some contaminant be 580 ppm before and 0.725 ppm after treatment. Then

So this is (better than) a 99% reduction, but not yet quite a 99.9% reduction.

The following table summarizes the most common cases.

{| class="wikitable"
! Log reduction
! Percentage
|-
|1-log reduction
|90%
|-
|2-log reduction
|99%
|-
|3-log reduction
|99.9%
|-
|4-log reduction
|99.99%
|-
|5-log reduction
|99.999%
|}

In general, if  is a whole number, an -log reduction corresponds to a percentage reduction with  leading digits "9" in the percentage (provided that it is at least 10%).

See also
Decimal reduction time

References

Dimensionless numbers
Logarithmic scales of measurement
Units of measurement
Units of chemical measurement